Kotono Mitsuishi is a Japanese voice-actress and former singer. She has released 7 studio albums and 4 singles throughout her singing career, and she has also appeared in over 45 Anime soundtracks and over 131 Drama CDs. 

She has performed in several seiyuu groups including Peach Hips (from the TV series Sailor Moon), Humming Bird (from the OVA series Idol Defense Force Hummingbird), and Angels (from the radio drama and OVA series Voogie's Angel).

Studio albums

Singles

Other Recordings

Soundtracks

Cassette Books/Drama Cassettes

Drama CDs

References

Discographies of Japanese artists